The Rascal Light Self-Propelled Howitzer is a lightweight mobile artillery system developed by Soltam Ltd, Israel.

The Rascal represents an entirely new design of SP gun. The objective of designing the Rascal was to make a gun light enough to not be restricted to the capacity of rural bridges, and so it could be air-lifted.

The vehicle is not based on any existing tank. The hull has a raised drivers compartment at the left front, the engine being behind the driver, and a central compartment for the commander and two gunners.

The 155mm (6.1 in) howitzer is installed on a platform at the rear of the vehicle and is power-operated. The gun may be either 39 or 52 calibers in length.

The Rascal Light carries 40 rounds of ammunition on board. These shells are stored in racks alongside the gun and cartridges in an Armour-protected compartment in the hull.

Tracked self-propelled howitzers
Self-propelled howitzers of Israel
155 mm artillery